"Stay the Night" is a 1980 song by Billy Ocean taken from his 1980 album City Limit. It was released as the follow-up to his hit single "Are You Ready?", and was also released as the B-side to this single in some countries. The song has been covered by La Toya Jackson and sampled by dance artist Lady on the 2002 Brazilian hit single .

La Toya Jackson version

"Stay the Night" was the third single released by American singer La Toya Jackson, and the first single from the 1981 album My Special Love. The track was produced by Ollie E. Brown, who produced much of the My Special Love album. The lyrics were slightly rewritten to reflect the gender change from Ocean's version.

The single peaked at #31 on the Billboard Hot Soul Singles chart. The single was released on 7" and 12" formats, with "Camp Kuchi Kaiai" on the B-side.

"Camp Kuchi Kaiai" was one of two songs Jackson co-wrote with her sister Janet Jackson; the other was "Lovely Is She" on Jackson's previous album. "Camp Kuchi Kaiai" has become well known in the UK's rare groove scene.

Jackson performed "Stay the Night" on the 10 October 1981 episode of "Soul Train".

References

1980 songs
1981 singles
Billy Ocean songs
La Toya Jackson songs
GTO Records singles
Songs written by Billy Ocean
Disco songs